Quito TV is a television channel in Ecuador. Since the start of their transmissions, on September 1 of 2006, the channel is the major television network of Ecuador.

It broadcasts on channel 20 to Quito and channel 16 to Guayaquil. The international version of the channel is available on Ecuador TV.

History 
Quito TV began broadcasting on September 1, 2006. Its headquarters are located in Quito, and the biggest self-supported antenna. Quito TV got the most powerful microwave radio relay, acquired the first mobile television unit.

Founded by Emilio Santander, the channel was under control of his family until 2007 and 2008. During the presidency of Rafael Correa, the network have the most broadcasting during the programming.

Programming

Soccer Broadcasts 
Quito TV has the rights to broadcast the home games of Deportivo Quito, Espoli, Imbabura, LDU Quito and Manta during the 2011 Copa Credife.

External links

Television channels in Ecuador
Spanish-language television stations
Television channels and stations established in 2006
Mass media in Quito